Henri Wijnoldy-Daniëls (26 November 1889 – 20 August 1932) was a Dutch épée, foil and sabre fencer. He won a bronze medal in the team sabre events at the 1920 and 1924 Summer Olympics.

References

External links
 

1889 births
1932 deaths
Dutch male épée fencers
Olympic fencers of the Netherlands
Fencers at the 1920 Summer Olympics
Fencers at the 1924 Summer Olympics
Fencers at the 1928 Summer Olympics
Olympic bronze medalists for the Netherlands
Olympic medalists in fencing
People from Sliedrecht
Medalists at the 1920 Summer Olympics
Medalists at the 1924 Summer Olympics
Dutch male foil fencers
Dutch male sabre fencers
Sportspeople from South Holland
20th-century Dutch people